TransBrasil was a Brazilian airline which ceased operations on 3 December 2001. During most of its history, Transbrasil was owned by local entrepreneur Omar Fontana. Its aircraft usually featured a colorful livery, remarkably with a rainbow on the tail fin. Transbrasil base was Brasilia International Airport in Brasilia. From the 1970s and until its demise in 2002, Transbrasil was usually the third largest Brazilian airline after Varig and VASP, serving both domestic and international routes.

History

The First Years as Sadia (1955–1972)

Transbrasil was born in the State of Santa Catarina as a sister company of S/A Indústria e Comércio Concórdia, better known by its acronym Sadia. In 1953 Omar Fontana, one of the sons of the founder of Sadia Attilio Fontana noticed a Douglas DC-3 that remained parked at Joaçaba Airport, near Concórdia, the whole weekend. Omar Fontana came up with the idea of leasing the aircraft for transporting the products of Sadia to São Paulo. In 1954 Sadia acquired its own Douglas DC-3 and flights became daily, having Omar as one of the crew members. However, since it was not an airline with regular schedule, it could not receive subventions from the government. In order to avoid this restriction, on January 5, 1955 he created Sadia S/A – Transportes Aéreos. The first regular flight was operated on March 16, 1956.

Sadia enlarged Concórdia Airport so that a Douglas DC-3 could operate with full load and created the first route from Concórdia to Videira, Florianópolis, São Paulo-Congonhas. A short time later, Sadia was also operating to Londrina, Bauru, Ribeirão Preto and Brasília.

In November 1957, Sadia established a partnership with Real Transportes Aéreos and became a feeder airline at Florianópolis. Whereas Linneu Gomes got 50% of the shares of Sadia, Omar Fontana became part of the board of Real, where he gained airline experience. At this time Sadia moved headquarters to São Paulo and expanded services to Rio de Janeiro-Santos Dumont and Porto Alegre. This partnership ended in 1961 with the demise of Real and Fontana bought back the shares he had earlier sold to Gomes.

In 1962 Sadia bought TASSA – Transportes Aéreos Salvador and increased its presence in Bahia. In 1967 most of Sadia network was eligible to receive subventions from the Federal government and aiming at those subventions Sadia bought five Handley Page Dart Heralds. In 1968 Sadia joined the shuttle service between Rio de Janeiro-Santos Dumont and São Paulo-Congonhas airports, operated since 1959 by Varig, Cruzeiro do Sul and VASP. This service was abandoned only in 1999.

The first jet airliner type to be introduced into the fleet of Sadia, a  stretched BAC One-Eleven Series 500, entered into service on September 17, 1970. In 1972 the name of the airline was changed to Transbrasil S/A Linhas Aéreas and its headquarters were moved to Brasília.

Consolidation as Transbrasil (1972–1983)

 1973 - Transbrasil replaces its ageing Dart Heralds by new Embraer EMB 110 Bandeirante light transport turboprops.
 1974 - Transbrasil starts to phase out its remainder Bandeirantes, Heralds and 1-11s, replacing them with Boeing 727-100. By 1979, its fleet consisted only of 727-100s.
 1983 - Its first Boeing 767-200 is delivered, and Transbrasil starts its international operations, initially with charter flights - and from 1989, with regular service - to Miami, Orlando and Washington D.C.

Apogee and Downturn (1983–2003)
 

In 1990 Transbrasil fleet consisted of three 767-200, three Boeing 707 for cargo and passenger service (operated by its affiliated company, Aerobrasil) and 15 leased Boeing 737-300 and -400. In addition to domestic flights to most of the larger Brazilian cities, Transbrasil offered regular and charter service to Miami, Orlando, New York, Washington, Buenos Aires, Vienna, Amsterdam, London and even Beijing. During some time, due to discounted ticket prices and an aggressive commercial strategy Transbrasil surpassed VASP as the second largest Brazilian airline.

Despite its growing market share, Transbrasil was already experiencing financial problems. In 1987 after a formal request of its chairman Omar Fontana, Brazilian government took over Transbrasil management. However, soon Fontana started to disagree with the Brazilian Air Force officers nominated to run the company and in 1989 the intervention was cancelled. After Fontana stepped out from Transbrasil management due to health issues, the company was run by his son-in-law Celso Cipriani - a former police officer with no previous experience on airline management. Cipriani tenure on Transbrasil was controversial, and he has been formally charged with fraud, embezzlement of funds and property and mismanagement since then.

On January 14, 1994, Transbrasil created its regional subsidiary Interbrasil STAR to operate as feeder-carrier. Services started on July 3, 1995. 

In addition to the management problems, Transbrasil was also facing other difficulties, specially the reduced or no profit from its international routes, severe competition from other companies in the domestic front (specially TAM, a former air taxi company with a growing fleet) and growing expenses. Following the September 11, 2001 terrorist attacks, despite several government loans, Transbrasil was amassing huge debts with several suppliers. When Shell refused to further supply fuel without payment, Transbrasil's then aging and reduced fleet was grounded on 3 December 2001. It never returned to the air, and was declared bankrupt in 2003 at the request of one of its major debtors - GE Capital Aviation Services.

After Bankruptcy (2003–2010)

On 16 September 2009 the Brazilian Federal Supreme Court began the analysis of the legality of the bankruptcy of Transbrasil. The bankruptcy was confirmed on 2 October 2009.

That same year, the Public Ministry was preparing to file charges against the senior management of the company. The main accused being Celso Cipriani, who allegedly committed crimes that hastened the company's demise.

In 2010, the debt which caused the bankruptcy of Transbrasil was invalidated by the Court of Justice of São Paulo.

On 15 February 2023, it was finally announced the possible retire of carcass of PT-TAA and PT-TAB after 21 years abandoned at Brasília Airport. On 17 February 2023, they were moved.

Destinations

Fleet

Airline Affinity Program
TransPass was Transbrasil's Frequent-flyer program. Points could be used on Transbrasil and Interbrasil STAR services. Points held at the time of the airline's collapse lost their value as no other airline took over the program.

Accidents and incidents

As Sadia
4 August 1963: a Douglas C-49E registration PP-SLL en route from Joaçaba to Videira crashed into a hill when approaching Videira under poor visibility. All 10 occupants died.
3 November 1967: a Handley Page Dart Herald 214 registration PP-SDJ flying from São Paulo-Congonhas to Curitiba-Afonso Pena collided with a hill during approach to land at Curitiba. All crew and 21 passengers died, 4 passengers survived.
16 March 1968: Douglas C-47A-35-DL (DC-3) registrationPP-AST en route from Miami to Arica Chile crashed near Tacna. All 4 occupants died.

As Transbrasil
22 January 1976: an Embraer EMB 110C Bandeirante registration PT-TBD operating flight 107 from Chapecó to Erechim, crashed upon take-off from Chapecó. Seven of the nine passengers and crew on board died.
12 April 1980: a Boeing 727-27C registration PT-TYS operating flight 303 flying from São Paulo-Congonhas to Florianópolis was on a night instrumental approach to Florianópolis Airport under a severe thunderstorm. The aircraft went off course, struck a hill and exploded. Probable causes are misjudgment of speed and distance, inadequate flight supervision, failure to initiate a go-around and improper operation of the engines. Of the 58 passengers and crew aboard, 3 passengers survived.
21 March 1989: Flight 801, a cargo Boeing 707-349C registration PT-TCS, flying from Manaus to São Paulo-Guarulhos, crashed at the district of Vila Barros in Guarulhos, shortly before touch-down at runway 09R. That day, at 12:00 the runway was going to be closed for maintenance and the crew decided to speed up procedures to touch-down before closure (it was already 11:54). In a hurry, one of the crew members, by mistake, activated the air-dynamic brakes and the aircraft lost too much speed to have enough aerodynamic support (Stall). As a consequence the aircraft crashed at approximately 2 km from the airport. There were 25 fatalities which of these three were crew members and 22 were civilians on the accident site. As well as the 22 fatalities, there were also over 200 injured on the ground. This aircraft was used in the filming of the movie Airport.

See also 

List of defunct airlines of Brazil

References

External links

Sadia accidents as per Aviation Safety Database
Transbrasil accidents as per Aviation Safety Database
Timetable Images of Transbrasil
Transbrasil Photo Archive at airliners.net
Transbrasil
Transbrasil (Portuguese)

 
Defunct airlines of Brazil
Airlines established in 1955
Airlines disestablished in 2003
1955 establishments in Brazil